Elderville is an unincorporated community in Hancock County, Illinois, United States.

Notes

Unincorporated communities in Hancock County, Illinois
Unincorporated communities in Illinois